The 2011 Balearic regional election was held on Sunday, 22 May 2011, to elect the 8th Parliament of the autonomous community of the Balearic Islands. All 59 seats in the Parliament were up for election. The election was held simultaneously with regional elections in twelve other autonomous communities and local elections all throughout Spain.

Political control of the islands had fluctuated in the preceding elections with the People's Party (PP) losing their majority and consequently, control to a coalition headed by the Socialist Party of the Balearic Islands (PSIB–PSOE) at the 2007 election. The 2011 election saw the PP regain their overall majority. The gains came largely at the expense of United Left, Convergence for the Isles (a successor to the late Majorcan Union), Republican Left and The Greens, all of whom lost their representation in this legislature. These parties had all won seats as part of various coalitions in the previous elections.

One of the first tasks of the Parliament was to elect the president of the Balearic Islands from among their number, with José Ramón Bauzá replacing Francesc Antich (1999–2003, and again 2007–2011) in the post.

Overview

Electoral system
The Parliament of the Balearic Islands was the devolved, unicameral legislature of the autonomous community of the Balearic Islands, having legislative power in regional matters as defined by the Spanish Constitution and the Balearic Statute of Autonomy, as well as the ability to vote confidence in or withdraw it from a regional president.

Voting for the Parliament was on the basis of universal suffrage, which comprised all nationals over 18 years of age, registered in the Balearic Islands and in full enjoyment of their political rights. Amendments to the electoral law in 2011 required for Balearic people abroad to apply for voting before being permitted to vote, a system known as "begged" or expat vote. The 59 members of the Parliament of the Balearic Islands were elected using the D'Hondt method and a closed list proportional representation, with an electoral threshold of five percent of valid votes—which included blank ballots—being applied in each constituency. Seats were allocated to constituencies, corresponding to the islands of Mallorca, Menorca, Ibiza and Formentera, with each being allocated a fixed number of seats: 33 for Mallorca, 13 for Menorca, 12 for Ibiza and 1 for Formentera.

Election date
The term of the Parliament of the Balearic Islands expired four years after the date of its previous election, unless it was dissolved earlier. The election decree was required to be issued no later than the twenty-fifth day prior to the date of expiry of parliament and published on the following day in the Official Gazette of the Balearic Islands (BOIB), with election day taking place on the fifty-fourth day from publication. The previous election was held on 27 May 2007, which meant that the legislature's term would have expired on 27 May 2011. The election decree was required to be published in the BOIB no later than 3 May 2011, with the election taking place on the fifty-fourth day from publication, setting the latest possible election date for the Parliament on Sunday, 26 June 2011.>

The president had the prerogative to dissolve the Parliament of the Balearic Islands and call a snap election, provided that no motion of no confidence was in process and that dissolution did not occur before one year had elapsed since the previous one. In the event of an investiture process failing to elect a regional president within a sixty-day period from the first ballot, the Parliament was to be automatically dissolved and a fresh election called.

Parties and candidates
The electoral law allowed for parties and federations registered in the interior ministry, coalitions and groupings of electors to present lists of candidates. Parties and federations intending to form a coalition ahead of an election were required to inform the relevant Electoral Commission within ten days of the election call, whereas groupings of electors needed to secure the signature of at least one percent of the electorate in the constituencies for which they sought election, disallowing electors from signing for more than one list of candidates.

Below is a list of the main parties and electoral alliances which contested the election:

Election debates

Opinion polls
The table below lists voting intention estimates in reverse chronological order, showing the most recent first and using the dates when the survey fieldwork was done, as opposed to the date of publication. Where the fieldwork dates are unknown, the date of publication is given instead. The highest percentage figure in each polling survey is displayed with its background shaded in the leading party's colour. If a tie ensues, this is applied to the figures with the highest percentages. The "Lead" column on the right shows the percentage-point difference between the parties with the highest percentages in a poll. When available, seat projections determined by the polling organisations are displayed below (or in place of) the percentages in a smaller font; 30 seats were required for an absolute majority in the Parliament of the Balearic Islands.

Results

Overall

Distribution by constituency

Aftermath

See also
2011 Balearic Island Councils elections
Results breakdown of the 2011 Spanish local elections (Balearic Islands)

Notes

References
Opinion poll sources

Other

2011 in the Balearic Islands
Balearic Islands
Regional elections in the Balearic Islands
May 2011 events in Europe